The April 1860 Suburbs of Auckland by-election was a New Zealand by-election held in the  electorate following the resignation of Frederick Merriman. He was replaced by Joseph Hargreaves unopposed.

The Suburbs of Auckland electorate was one of the original 24 electorates used for the 1st New Zealand Parliament in 1853 and existed until the end of the term of the 2nd New Zealand Parliament in 1860. It was a two-member electorate.

Merriman resigned on 13 March 1860 and was replaced on 5 April by Hargreaves. Theophilus Heale—the other representative of the electorate at that time—thanked the electors for electing Hargreaves.

References

Auckland 1860 2
1860 elections in New Zealand
Politics of the Auckland Region
April 1860 events
1860s in Auckland
History of Auckland